Crenicichla tapii is a species of cichlid native to South America. It is found in the lower Iguazú River basin above the Iguazú Falls in Argentina. Distributional range extends upstream of the Misiones Province, Argentina into the neighboring state of Paraná, Brazil.

References

tapii
Fish of Argentina
Freshwater fish of Brazil
Taxa named by Lubomír Piálek
Taxa named by Klára Dragová
Taxa named by Jorge Rafael Casciotta
Taxa named by Adriana Edith Almirón
Taxa named by Oldřich Říčan
Fish described in 2015